The 1992 Brownlow Medal was the 65th year the award was presented to the player adjudged the fairest and best player during the Australian Football League (AFL) home and away season. Scott Wynd of the Footscray Football Club was the outright winner of the medal count, becoming the ninth individual to win the award while playing for Footscray.

Leading votegetters 

* The player was ineligible to win the medal due to suspension by the AFL Tribunal during the year.

References

External Links
 
 

1992 in Australian rules football
Brownlow Medal
1992 Australian Football League season